Okuje  is a village in Croatia with a population of 467 (census 2011).

References

Populated places in Zagreb County
Velika Gorica